Peter C Trunkfield (1930 – 28 December ) was a leading English rugby union administrator.

A member of Marlow Rugby Club and the Buckinghamshire Rugby Union, he served as President of the Rugby Football Union in 1998-1999, having previously served as vice president to Peter Brook. For over twenty years he acted as a popular liaison officer for touring teams from the southern hemisphere. He was a former Bletchley player.

Notes

1930 births
2010 deaths
English rugby union players
English rugby union administrators
Rugby union players from Buckinghamshire